David Jolley is a horn soloist and chamber musician.

Jolley studied at the Juilliard School in New York. Primarily known for playing the Classical repertoire, Jolley also plays modern music. His discography includes a recording of two Mozart horn concertos with the Orpheus Chamber Orchestra.  He is currently on the faculty of Mannes School of Music, Manhattan School of Music, and Queens College, City University of New York.

See also 
List of ambient music artists

References

External links 

 Mannes College, the New School for Music

Year of birth missing (living people)
Ambient musicians
American classical horn players
American classical musicians
Juilliard School alumni
Living people
North Carolina School of the Arts faculty
Place of birth missing (living people)